Savannah Christian Preparatory School (SCPS) is a private, college preparatory, non-denominational Christian school located in Savannah, Georgia, United States.

Campuses

Chatham Parkway 
The  Chatham Parkway campus hosts over 1,180 lower, middle and upper school students, and 250 daycare/preschool students. Facilities include thirteen buildings with classrooms, labs, media centers, gyms, a dining hall, an outdoor pool, a track, five athletic fields, three playgrounds, and the Ecological Diversity for Educational Networking (E.D.E.N.) Outdoor Education Center.

This campus is the site of the Eckburg Center (opened in November 2007) which is the new fine arts and athletic facility for the Upper School as well as the new daycare/preschool center (opened in August 2008).

History 
On September 17, 1951, Rev. George and Mrs. Harold Deane Akins, launched SCPS as the "Evangelical Bible Institute" with eight students. It officially became Savannah Christian School in 1954, and then Savannah Christian Preparatory School (SCPS) in 1978.

Student activities

Athletics 
The Upper School currently competes in Region 3-A of the Georgia High School Association (GHSA). The Middle School competes in the Savannah Parochial Athletic League (SPAL).

Middle school:
 Boys - football, cross country, basketball, baseball, soccer, golf, track 		
 Girls - volleyball, cross country, basketball, soccer, golf, track, softball

Upper school:	
 Boys - football, cross country, basketball, baseball, soccer, golf, tennis, track, wrestling, lacrosse 		
 Girls - volleyball, cross country, softball, competitive cheerleading, basketball, soccer, golf, tennis, track, lacrosse

Fine arts 
Band is offered to 5th grade, with nearly 70% of the class participating. Students are divided into four groups that meet once per week and perform in concert at least twice each year. Choir is not provided for fifth grade.

Drama 

Savannah Christian Preparatory School annually produces classic Broadway musical productions with casts of 3rd through 12th grade students.

Notable alumni 

 Brian Harman - professional golfer
 Diane Lane - actress
 Jalen Myrick - NFL cornerback for the Jacksonville Jaguars

References

External links 
 

Christian schools in Georgia (U.S. state)
Educational institutions established in 1951
Nondenominational Christian schools in the United States
Private high schools in Georgia (U.S. state)
Private middle schools in Georgia (U.S. state)
Private elementary schools in Georgia (U.S. state)
Schools in Savannah, Georgia
1951 establishments in Georgia (U.S. state)